Tastiera Shqip DK is an Albanian modified keyboard layout, fully compliant with the new way Albanians use the computers. The layout was studied by the teams of Pasioni and Albword. The software is free to download, use and distribute for personal use only.

External links
Tastiera Shqip DK on Pasioni
AS Tastiera shqipe

Keyboard layouts